Vele Srakane is an island in the Croatian part of Adriatic Sea. It is situated between Lošinj, Unije and Susak, just north of Male Srakane. Its area is 1.15 km2, and it has a population of 3 (2011 census), down from 8 in 2001. Highest peak is Vela straža, 59 meters high.  there are no cars, no shops and no running water on the island. Electricity, however, is available. There is no harbour suitable for sheltering on the island, just two concrete piers unsuitable for longer containment, and the coast contains numerous reefs.  This leads the islanders to ground their boats rather than anchor them. The island has been inhabited since prehistory. On Vela Straža, there are remnants of this prehistoric settlement.

References

External links

Robinzoni ne vole golaće 

Islands of Croatia
Landforms of Primorje-Gorski Kotar County
Islands of the Adriatic Sea